Eugene Bennett may refer to:

 Eugene Bennett (artist) (1921–2010), American visual artist
 Eugene Paul Bennett (1892–1970), British soldier and Victoria Cross recipient

See also 
 Eugene Bennett Fluckey (1913–2007), United States Navy submarine commander and Medal of Honor recipient